Kent Taylor (born Louis William Weiss; May 11, 1907 – April 11, 1987) was an American actor of film and television. Taylor appeared in more than 110 films, the bulk of them B-movies in the 1930s and 1940s, although he also had roles in more prestigious studio releases, including Merrily We Go to Hell (1932), I'm No Angel (1933), Cradle Song (1933), Death Takes a Holiday (1934), Payment on Demand (1951), and Track the Man Down (1955).  He had the lead role in Half Past Midnight in 1948, among a few others.

Early years
Kent Taylor was born Louis William Weiss on May 11, 1907 to a Jewish family in Nashua, Iowa, Taylor moved with his family to Waterloo, Iowa, when he was 7. He worked at a variety of jobs after high school, and for two years he studied engineering at the Darrah Institute of Technology in Chicago. He and his family moved to California in 1931.

Career
With no prior professional acting experience, Kent began working as a film extra in 1931 on the advice of a friend who said he had the right looks for "a good screen type." Prior to background work, he was co-operator of an awning service shop with his father. After a few very minor extra roles in films such as Kick In (1931), he was called in "to try out a new camera idea;" a silent sequence was shot using Taylor and Claire Dodd, who was by then an established player at Paramount. The test led to Taylor being offered a contract with Paramount, which he signed on July 11, 1931.

Taylor portrayed Doc Holliday in Tombstone, the Town Too Tough to Die (1942) starring Richard Dix as Wyatt Earp.

In 1951–1952, with his movie career on the decline and television production on the upswing, he played the title role in 58 episodes of the detective series Boston Blackie and the lead, as Captain Jim Flagg, in ABC's The Rough Riders, an adventure series about three soldiers, two Union and one Confederate, traveling together through the American West after the Civil War. The Rough Riders aired thirty-nine episodes from 1958 to 1959.

Other minor screen credits include My Little Margie, Tales of Wells Fargo, Zorro, Riverboat, The Rifleman, Tombstone Territory, Sugarfoot, Bat Masterson, Laramie, Mr. Lucky, Tightrope, Peter Gunn, Hawaiian Eye, The Brothers Brannagan, The Ann Sothern Show, Voyage to the Bottom of the Sea, and Rango.

He starred in the 1962 film The Broken Land with Jack Nicholson and Diana Darrin. The last years of his career were spent in low budget biker and horror films such as Brides of Blood (1968), Satan's Sadists (1969), The Mighty Gorga (1969), Brain of Blood (1971), Blood of Ghastly Horror (1972), Angels' Wild Women (1972), and Girls for Rent (1974).

Clark Kent
Along with Clark Gable, Kent Taylor served as the inspiration behind the name of Superman's alter-ego Clark Kent.

Personal life

Taylor died on April 9, 1987 at age 79, at the Motion Picture & Television Country House and Hospital in Woodland Hills, California, of complications during heart surgery.

Selected filmography

 Born to Love (1931) as Dancing Doughboy (uncredited)
 Ladies' Man (1931) as Night Club Patron (uncredited)
 Kick In (1931) as Counter Man in Shop (uncredited)
 The Magnificent Lie (1931) as Cafe Customer (uncredited)
 The Road to Reno (1931) as One of Jackie's Admirers (uncredited)
 The False Madonna (1931) as Footman (uncredited)
 Husband's Holiday (1931) as Miguel Balboa (scenes deleted)
 Two Kinds of Women (1932) as Milt Fleisser (uncredited)
 Dancer in the Dark (1932) as Saxophonist (uncredited)
 One Hour with You (1932) as Party Guest Greeted by Colette (uncredited)
 Sinners in the Sun (1932) as Dancing Gigolo (uncredited)
 Forgotten Commandments (1932) as Gregor
 Merrily We Go to Hell (1932) as Gregory 'Greg' Boleslavsky
 The Man from Yesterday (1932) as Military Policeman (uncredited)
 Make Me a Star (1932) as Theatre Doorman Ticket Taker (uncredited)
 Devil and the Deep (1932) as A Friend at Party (uncredited)
 Blonde Venus (1932) as Hiker (uncredited)
 The Night of June 13 (1932) as Reporter (uncredited)
 If I Had a Million (1932) as Bank Teller (uncredited)
 The Sign of the Cross (1932) as Romantic Spectator (uncredited)
 Under-Cover Man (1932) as Russ (uncredited)
 The Mysterious Rider (1933) as Wade Benton
 Tonight Is Ours (1933) as Minor Role (uncredited)
 A Lady's Profession (1933) as Dick Garfield
 The Story of Temple Drake (1933) as First Jellybean (uncredited)
 Sunset Pass (1933) as Clink Peeples
 I'm No Angel (1933) as Kirk Lawrence
 White Woman (1933) as David von Elst
 Cradle Song (1933) as Antonio Perez
 David Harum (1934) as John Lennox
 Death Takes a Holiday (1934) as Corrado
 Double Door (1934) as Rip Van Brett
 The Scarlet Empress (1934) as Paul (uncredited)
 Many Happy Returns (1934) as Movie Actor (uncredited)
 Mrs. Wiggs of the Cabbage Patch (1934) as Bob Redding
 Limehouse Blues (1934) (aka East End Chant) as Eric Benton
 The County Chairman (1935) as Ben Harvey
 College Scandal (1935) as Seth Dunlap
 Smart Girl (1935) as Nick Graham
 Without Regret (1935) as Steven Paradin
 Two-Fisted (1935) as Clint Blackburn
 My Marriage (1936) as John DeWitt Tyler III
 The Sky Parade (1936) as Tommy Wade
 Florida Special (1936) as Wally Tucker
 Ramona (1936) as Felipe Moreno
 The Accusing Finger (1936) as Jerry Welch
 When Love Is Young (1937) as Andy Russell
 Wings Over Honolulu (1937) as Gregory Chandler
 Love in a Bungalow (1937) as Jeff Langan
 The Lady Fights Back (1937) as Owen Merrill
 A Girl with Ideas (1937) as Frank Barnes
 Prescription for Romance (1937) as Steve Macy
 The Jury's Secret (1938) as Walter Russell
 The Last Express (1938) as Duncan MacLain
 Pirates of the Skies (1939) as Robert Maitland
 Four Girls in White (1939) as Nick Conlon
 The Gracie Allen Murder Case (1939) as Bill Brown
 Five Came Back (1939) as Joe Brooks
 Three Sons (1939) as Gene Pardway
 Sued for Libel (1939) as Steve Lonegan
 Escape to Paradise (1939) as Richard Fleming
 I Take This Woman (1940) as Phil Mayberry
 Two Girls on Broadway (1940) as 'Chat' Chatsworth
 Girl in 313 (1940) as Gregg Dunn
 Girl from Avenue A (1940) as MacMillan Forrester
 Men Against the Sky (1940) as Martin Ames
 I'm Still Alive (1940) as Steve Bennett
 Repent at Leisure (1941) as Richard Hughes
 Washington Melodrama (1941) as Hal Thorne
 Frisco Lil (1942) as Peter Brewster
 Gang Busters (1942, Serial) as Det. Lt. Bill Bannister
 Mississippi Gambler (1942) as John J. 'Johnny' Forbes
 Tombstone, the Town Too Tough to Die (1942) as Doc Holiday
 Halfway to Shanghai (1942) as Frederick Barton
 Army Surgeon (1942) as Lt. Philip 'Phil' Harvey
 Bomber's Moon (1943) as Capt. Paul von Block
 Roger Touhy, Gangster (1944) as Police Capt. Steven Warren
 Alaska (1944) as Gary Corbett
 The Daltons Ride Again (1945) as Bob Dalton
 Young Widow (1946) as Peter Waring
 Smooth as Silk (1946) as Mark Fenton
 Tangier (1946) as Ramon
 Deadline for Murder (1946) as Steve Millard
 Dangerous Millions (1946) as Jack Clark
 The Crimson Key (1947) as Lawrence 'Larry' Morgan
 Second Chance (1947) as Kendal Wolf
 Half Past Midnight (1948) as Wade Hamilton
 The Sickle or the Cross (1949) as Rev. John Burnside
 Federal Agent at Large (1950) as Mark Reed, aka Nick Ravel
 Western Pacific Agent (1950) as Rod Kendall
 Trial Without Jury (1950) as Jed Kilgore
 Payment on Demand (1951) as Robert Townsend
 Playgirl (1954) as Ted Andrews
 Track the Man Down (1955) as John Ford
 Secret Venture (1955) as Ted O'Hara
 The Phantom from 10,000 Leagues (1955) as Dr. Ted Stevens
 Slightly Scarlet (1956) as Frank Jansen
 Ghost Town (1956) as Anse Conroy
 Frontier Gambler (1956) as Roger 'The Duke' Chadwick
 The Iron Sheriff (1957) as Phil Quincy
 The Restless Gun (1958) Episode "Imposter for a Day"
 Fort Bowie (1958) as Col. James Garrett
 Gang War (1958) as Bryce Barker, Meadows' Attorney
 Walk Tall (1960) as Frank Carter
 The Purple Hills (1961) as Johnny Barnes
 The Broken Land (1962) as Marshal Jim Cogan
 The Firebrand (1962) as Maj. Tim Bancroft
 The Day Mars Invaded Earth (1962) (aka Spaceraid 63) as Dr. David Fielding
 Harbor Lights (1963) as Dan Crown
 The Crawling Hand (1963) as Dr. Max Weitzberg
 Law of the Lawless (1964) as Attorney Rand McDonald
 Blood of Ghastly Horror (1967) as Dr. Elton Corey
 Brides of Blood (1968) as Dr. Paul Henderson
 Satan's Sadists (1969) as Lew
 The Mighty Gorga (1969) as Tonga Jack Adams
 Hell's Bloody Devils (1970) as Count Otto Von Delberg
 Brain of Blood (1971) as Dr. Trenton
 Angels' Wild Women (1972) as Parker
 I Spit on Your Corpse (1974) (aka Girls for Rent) as Moreno

References

External links

Episodes of Boston Blackie television program starring Kent Taylor — from YouTube

1907 births
1987 deaths
American male film actors
Jewish American male actors
American male television actors
Burials at Westwood Village Memorial Park Cemetery
Male actors from Iowa
20th-century American male actors
20th-century American Jews